Pat Ast (October 21, 1941 – October 3, 2001) was an American actress and model. She was best known for starring in Andy Warhol films and being a Halston model and muse in the 1970s.

Early life
Patricia Ann Ast was born on October 21, 1941 in the Flatbush neighborhood of Brooklyn, New York, to Jewish parents Irwin and Rose (Ludwig) Ast. She attended Erasmus Hall High School in Prospect Lefferts Garden, Brooklyn.

Career
Ast enjoyed partying in her twenties on Fire Island, and her boisterous personality allowed her to meet and befriend influential people. She had aspirations to become an actress, singer and model despite her day job as a receptionist at a box factory. She made her screen debut after meeting director John Schlesinger on Fire Island, who cast her as a party guest in his film Midnight Cowboy (1969). Around that time, she caught the attention of fashion designer Halston, who gave her a job at his boutique and made her one of his models, despite her weighing 210 pounds, in a time when most models were extremely thin. In the early 1970s, with Pat Cleveland, Connie Cook, Alva Chinn, Anjelica Huston, Karen Bjornson, among others, Ast became one of Halston's favored troupe of models, nicknamed the Halstonettes. She also appeared in runway shows for Halston and Yves St. Laurent, closing the 1972  Coty Awards runway show for Halston by popping out of a giant cake. She later became associated with Andy Warhol, who gave her the role of landlady Lydia in his film Heat (1972) alongside Joe Dallesandro.

In 1975, Ast moved to Hollywood to pursue her acting career. She has appeared in films such as The Duchess and the Dirtwater Fox (1976), Foul Play (1978), The Incredible Shrinking Woman (1981), and Reform School Girls (1986).

She became resentful of Los Angeles as her film career stalled. She went to New York to do Nine, a Broadway musical based on Federico Fellini’s movie 8 1/2, but was dismissed after three months.

Death 
Ast's lifelong battle with diabetes worsened in the last decade of her life, resulting in the amputation of some toes.

Halston’s death in 1990 affected her tremendously, and she was said to never have been the same.

Ast died on October 2, 2001 at her home in West Hollywood, California. Her death came three weeks after the death of her longtime friend Berry Berenson, who was killed in the September 11 attacks. Ast's neighbors noticed that the newspapers were piling up outside her door and that she hadn't been out to walk her dogs in a few days. Concerned, they called a friend of Ast's, who found her dead on her bed. It was reported that she had died of natural causes.

Due to scheduling conflicts among the attendees, there were two memorial services. Among the guests were Richard Benjamin, Paula Prentiss, Bud Cort, and Paul Reubens. Ast was buried at Mount Sinai Memorial Park Cemetery in Hollywood Hills.

Filmography

References

External links 

 
 

1941 births
2001 deaths
American female models
Female models from New York (state)
20th-century American actresses
American film actresses
American television actresses
People from Brooklyn
Erasmus Hall High School alumni
Burials at Mount Sinai Memorial Park Cemetery
People associated with The Factory
Jewish American actresses